Jaunķemeri is a residential area and neighbourhood of the city Jūrmala, Latvia. It is located on the shore of the Gulf of Riga between Kaugurciems and Bigauņciems and inside the territory of Ķemeri National Park.

References 

Neighbourhoods in Jūrmala